Voice chat is telecommunication via voice over IP technologies—especially when those technologies are used among players in multiplayer online games.

Users might use either a VoIP engine system that is built into the game, or a separate program.

Video game consoles
In 2000, SegaNet released the first voice-chat-compatible browser for the Dreamcast. Internet services such as YahooChat! worked on the Java-compatible web browsers with the ability of voice chat with the microphone, although it was already available for use in its HTML servers.  This browser web integration became a standard in future game consoles.

Long-distance telephone programs such as Dream call were already integrated within the browser.  Other games such as Seaman and Alien Front Online included voice chat via the microphone. In 2001, Sony released the Network adapter for their PlayStation 2 video game console, which allowed voice chatting with a headset. In 2002, Microsoft launched the Xbox Live service, which supports voice chatting. Later, Microsoft required all Xbox Live console game developers to integrate voice chat capability into their games and bundled a microphone and headset with the Xbox Live retail unit. In 2005, Nintendo launched the Nintendo Wi-Fi Connection, an online multiplayer service for both the Nintendo DS and for the Wii. Metroid Prime Hunters, which was released in March 2006, was the first game that allowed voice chatting through the Nintendo DS's microphone. Nintendo also released a Nintendo DS headset for voice chat alongside the release of Pokémon Diamond and Pearl (2006).

While voice chat has become a big hit in console games, it also created problems such as griefing or the persistent harassment of other players online. Voice capability is said to present the greatest risk of traditional cyberbullying and harassment. For instance, it is being used to send sexist and misogynistic communications towards female players. A specific example was a publicized audio recording of EVE Online players perpetrating the so-called "Bonus Round" scam over voice chat. Portions of the audio contained graphic language.

Ventrilo was popular among online gamers to coordinate group gaming efforts until Mumble, TeamSpeak and Discord came out.

In 2021, Discord has become very popular voice chat among gamers. While games like World of Warcraft have integrated a VOIP voice chat the preferred way to coordinate as a group in chat is Discord, TeamSpeak or Mumble. In 2022, Xbox Series X/S as well as Xbox One consoles added the ability to use Discord's voice chat while on the console. In early 2023, Sony will be adding voice chat support on Discord to the PlayStation 5.

See also

 Comparison of VoIP software
 Massively multiplayer online game
 Online game
 Video game culture

References

Online chat
Voice over IP
Online video game services